Graphalloy is the trademark for a group of metal-impregnated graphite materials. The materials are commonly used for self-lubricating plain bearings or electrical contacts. They are proprietary materials owned by the Graphite Metallizing Corp. based in Yonkers, New York, USA.

Construction
When the metal is impregnated in the graphite it forms long continuous filaments. These are what gives the material its ductility, strength, and heat dissipation properties.

Types
There are many types of Graphalloy because the graphite can be impregnated with many different metals.

Applications
Graphalloy is used in applications where high and low temperatures are encountered, grease or oil is not feasible, expulsion of wear particles is prohibited, or in dusty, submerged, or corrosive environments. It is non-corrosive in gasoline, jet fuel, solvents, bleaches, caustics, dyes, liquefied gases, acids, and many more chemicals. It is not used in highly abrasive applications. Common applications include bushings/bearings for pumps, bleaching and washing tanks, ovens, industrial dryers, steam turbines, kilns, cryogenics.

It is also used as bearing in applications where electrical conduction is necessary. It is used in when high frequency current degrades ball or needle bearings. Examples of applications include packaging machines, radar joints, and welding equipment.

References

External links
 

Composite materials
Bearings (mechanical)